Bradley Klahn and Jackson Withrow were the defending champions but only Klahn chose to defend his title, partnering Robert Galloway. Klahn successfully defended his title.

Klahn and Galloway won the title after defeating Darian King and Peter Polansky 7–6(7–4), 4–6, [10–8] in the final.

Seeds

Draw

References
 Main Draw

Challenger Banque Nationale de Gatineau - Men's Doubles
2018 Men's Doubles